Events in the year 1971 in Israel.

Incumbents
 President of Israel – Zalman Shazar
 Prime Minister of Israel – Golda Meir (Alignment)
 President of the Supreme Court – Shimon Agranat
 Chief of General Staff – Haim Bar-Lev
 Government of Israel – 15th Government of Israel

Events

 15 May – Three members of the Turkish Liberation Army, an underground militant organization linked to the PLO, kidnapped and executed Israeli consul-general Efraim Elrom in Ankara.
 25 May – The body of Efraim Elrom is found in Istanbul.

Israeli–Palestinian conflict 
The most prominent events related to the Israeli–Palestinian conflict which occurred during 1971 include:

Notable Palestinian militant operations against Israeli targets

The most prominent Palestinian Arab terror attacks committed against Israelis during 1971 include:

Notable Israeli military operations against Palestinian militancy targets

The most prominent Israeli military counter-terrorism operations (military campaigns and military operations) carried out against Palestinian militants during 1971 include:

Unknown dates 
 The founding of the kibbutz El Rom.

Notable births 
 15 January – Inbal Perlmutter, Israeli musician (died 1997).
 30 January – Assaf Amdursky, Israeli singer.
 13 February – Alon Harazi, Israeli footballer.
 7 March – Tal Banin, Israeli footballer.
 12 April – Eyal Golan, Israeli singer.

Notable deaths
 4 April – Shlomo-Yisrael Ben-Meir (born 1910), Russian (Poland)-born Israeli politician.
 6 June – Yitzhak Tabenkin (born 1888), Russian (Belarus)-born Zionist activist and Israeli politician.
 10 July – Chaim Sheba (born 1908), Austro-Hungarian (Bukovina)-born Israeli physician.
 19 July – Eliyahu-Moshe Ganhovsky (born 1901), Russian (Poland)-born Israeli politician and Religious Zionist activist.
 7 August – Yitzhak-Meir Levin (born 1893), Russian (Poland)-born Haredi Jewish Polish and Israeli politician, an Israeli government minister and a former leader of Agudat Israel.
 28 August – Reuvein Margolies (born 1889), Austro-Hungarian (Galicia)-born Israeli author and Talmudic scholar.
 1 September – Mordechai Ofer (born 1924), Polish-born Israeli politician.
 17 October – Shimon Bejarano (born 1910), Bulgarian-born Israeli politician.
 12 December – Yechezkel Kutscher (born 1909), Austro-Hungarian (Slovakia)-born Israeli philologist and Hebrew linguist.
 Full date unknown
 Yehoshua Bertonov (born 1879), Russian (Lithuania)-born Israeli stage actor.
 Hillel Oppenheimer (born 1899), German-born Israeli professor of botany.

Major public holidays

See also
 1971 in Israeli film
 1971 in Israeli television
 1971 in Israeli music
 1971 in Israeli sport

References

External links